ForgeRock, Inc. is a multinational identity and access management software company headquartered in San Francisco, U.S. with offices in Bristol, London, Grenoble, Vancouver (U.S.), Oslo, Munich, Paris, Sydney, and Singapore. The ForgeRock Identity Platform is a full-suite IAM and identity governance and administration (IGA) solution, can be implemented across an organization for all identities (workforce, consumers and things), and offers feature parity across all delivery options, including on-premise, any cloud environment, multi-cloud, hybrid, and as a service (SaaS). Fran Rosch is the CEO of ForgeRock. ForgeRock has raised $250 million in venture funding from Accel Partners, Foundation Capital, Meritech Capital Partners, Riverwood Capital and KKR.

The company has 1,300 enterprise customers in total, including the BBC, BMW, GEICO, Maersk, Philips, Standard Chartered, Toyota, Weight Watchers (WW), and more.

ForgeRock was founded in Norway in February 2010 by a group of former Sun Microsystems employees, after Sun was acquired by Oracle Corporation. After the acquisition, the software was scheduled for phase-out in favor of Oracle’s in-house product, so the founders "started their own company to fork the code and continue developing Sun’s software."

In April 2020, ForgeRock announced that it has raised $93.5 million in funding, a Series E it will use to continue expanding, which "brings the total raised by the company to $230 million." The company went public in September 2021. It’s listed on the New York Stock Exchange under the ticker symbol FORG. 

On October 11, 2022, private equity firm Thoma Bravo, agreed to purchase ForgeRock for $2.3 billion in an all-cash deal.

Products 
The ForgeRock Identity Platform includes a suite of identity management, access management, intelligent access, identity gateway, directory services, identity governance, autonomous identity, and edge security capabilities to serve enterprise consumer, workforce, and IoT requirements. The platform is consumable as a cloud service through ForgeRock Identity Cloud, or deployable through self-managed options, including public cloud, private cloud, and on-premises environments. 

The ForgeRock Identity Platform includes Access Management (based on the OpenAM open source project), Identity Management (based on the OpenIDM open source project), Directory Services (based on the OpenDJ open source project), and Identity Gateway (based on the OpenIG open source project). ForgeRock Access Management provides access management, ForgeRock Directory Services is an LDAP directory service, ForgeRock Identity Management is used for identity management, and ForgeRock Identity Gateway provides an identity gateway for web traffic and application programming interfaces (APIs). ForgeRock also offers a Profile and Privacy Management Dashboard for compliance with the EU General Data Protection Regulation (GDPR) and provides support for the User-Managed Access (UMA) 2.0 standard.

Originally based on open source software owned by Sun Microsystems (now Oracle Corporation), the enterprise version of the ForgeRock Identity Platform can only be accessed by purchasing a commercial license. The source code of the community version is publicly available under the terms of the Common Development and Distribution License.

References

Further reading
 
 
 
 
"Industry Collaboration Will Utilize Digital Patient Identity and Consent to Advance Clinical Care". GlobeNewswire. May 3, 2018. Retrieved August 2, 2018. 
"ForgeRock Opens Up Open Banking". GlobeNewswire. July 19, 2018. Retrieved August 2, 2018.

External links
 

Identity management
Identity management systems
Companies based in San Francisco
American companies established in 2010
2010 establishments in California
Companies listed on the New York Stock Exchange
Announced information technology acquisitions
Software companies established in 2010
Software companies of the United States